Underhand serve or Underhanded serve may refer to:

 Underhand serve (pickleball)
 Underhand serve (tennis)
 Underhand serve (volleyball)

See also
 Underhand (disambiguation)
 Serve (disambiguation)